Richard LeBlanc (born September 1, 1958) is an American politician from Michigan. LeBlanc was a Democratic member of the Michigan House of Representatives. In 2006 he was elected to represent Michigan's 18th State House District, which is located in Wayne County and includes the entire city of Westland. Prior to serving in the State House, LeBlanc served as a Westland City Councilman.

Early life
On September 1, 1958, LeBlanc was born in Westland, Michigan.

Career 
LeBlanc started his career as a reserved police officer in Canton, Michigan.

LeBlanc served as a trustee for Wayne/Westland Community Schools, Board of Education from 1992 to 1995. He was elected to the Westland City Council, where he served from 1995 to 2001 and 2003 to 2006. 

In 2006 he filed to run for the seat being vacated by Rep. Glenn S. Anderson, who ran successfully for the Michigan State Senate. LeBlanc won easily in the heavily Democratic 18th District, which is located in Wayne County and includes the Detroit suburb of Westland. In the House, LeBlanc sits on the Appropriations Committee and was Chairman of the Michigan State Police and the Military and Veterans Affairs Committee.

Personal life 
LeBlanc's wife is Cheryl LeBlanc. They have two children. LeBlanc and his family live in Westland, Michigan.

References

External links
Official Web site
LeBlanc's House Democrats Web site
LeBlanc's Campaign Site
LeBlanc's Personal Site
 Richard LeBlanc at ballotpedia.org

1958 births
Living people
Members of the Michigan House of Representatives
People from Ferndale, Michigan